Martin State Forest is a  state forest in Martin County, Indiana. The nearest city to the forest is Shoals. Martin State Forest is administered by the Indiana Department of Natural Resources.

External links
Indiana Department of Natural Resources - Martin State Forest

Protected areas of Martin County, Indiana
Indiana state forests